Dewan Taimur Raja Chowdhury was a Bangladesh Nationalist Party politician, landowner and poet. He was the former member of parliament from Sylhet-7.

Early life 
Chowdhury was born on 5 November 1917, into a Bengali Muslim family in Rampasha, Bishwanath, Sylhet District, Assam Province, British India. His father was Khan Bahadur Dewan Eklimur Raja and his mother was Meherjan Banu. His paternal grandfather was the renowned Bengali mystic Hason Raja.

Chowdhury began his education in Rajaganj Primary School before enrolling at the Sylhet Government Alia Madrasah where he did Islamic studies and also studied Bengali, Arabic, Persian and Urdu. He then moved on to study at Rasamay Memorial High School and Sylhet Government High School. He graduated from Murari Chand College. As a student he was the Secretary of Assam Provincial Muslim Students Federation.

Career 
Chowdhury's career began with taking care of his father's various properties such as the Alijan Coal Mine in Assam, Rupamukhi and Sonamukhi in Tripura, and Moulvibazar Tea Garden. From 1943 to 1946, Chowdhury was the honorary magistrate of Sylhet District. He went on to serve as Vice Chairman and than Chairman of Sylhet Local Board. In 1946, he was elected to the Assam Provincial Assembly. He was involved in the 1947 Sylhet referendum that saw Sylhet rejoin with East Bengal.

Chowdhury joined the East Pakistan Muslim League and served as the President of Sylhet District Muslim League. In 1965, he was elected to East Pakistan Provincial Assembly. Chowdhury was made the President of Bangladesh Nationalist Party Sylhet unit in 1979. Chowdhury was elected to parliament from Sylhet-7 as a Bangladesh Nationalist Party candidate in 1979. He was a State Minister in the Cabinet of President Ziaur Rahman. He wrote mystical poems and songs like his grandfather. He founded the Dewan Taimur Raja Trust with support from Islami Bank.

Personal life
Chowdhury was married to Shaila Ahsanullah of the Dhaka Nawab Family. She was a daughter of Nawabzada Khwaja Ahsanullah, the youngest son of Nawab Salimullah. Begum Ahsanullah was his wife's stepmother.

Death 
Chowdhury died on 14 December 1997.

References 

Bangladesh Nationalist Party politicians
1917 births
1997 deaths
2nd Jatiya Sangsad members
People from British India
Pakistani politicians
Sylhet Government Alia Madrasah alumni